Western Michigan University Homer Stryker M.D. School of Medicine (WMed) is a private medical school in Kalamazoo, Michigan. WMed was established in 2012 and confers the Doctor of Medicine (MD) degree, as well as Master of Science in Biomedical Sciences degree and the Master of Science in Medical Engineering degree. WMed is a collaboration between Western Michigan University and Kalamazoo's two teaching hospitals, Ascension Borgess (formerly Borgess Health) and Bronson Healthcare. The inaugural class of 54 students started in August 2014.

Although affiliated with the public Western Michigan University, WMed is administratively a private nonprofit school under a separate corporate charter, supported by private gifts, clinical revenue, student tuition, and endowment income.  In March 2011, Western Michigan University received a gift of $100 million for the medical school from the Stryker family. In 2018, WMed was granted full accreditation by the Liaison Committee on Medical Education (LCME), graduated its first class of 48 students, and all graduates were matched to residency programs across the nation.

Campus
WMU Homer Stryker M.D. School of Medicine is housed in eight locations in Kalamazoo, Michigan including a medical education facility on Portage Street in downtown Kalamazoo, and clinical sites on Oakland Drive, the Family Health Center on Paterson Street, and on the Borgess Medical Center Campus on Shaffer Street. The home of the new medical school includes WMed Health, a modern 60,000 square foot clinical building on the Oakland Drive Campus, and a seven-story 350,000 square foot educational building in downtown Kalamazoo that was donated by MPI Research. Located on the new W.E. Upjohn M.D. Campus, the educational building underwent a $68 million renovation and expansion project and opened in June 2014. The second phase of renovations completed in 2016 provides basic science laboratory research space and equipment. In 2019, the renovation of an unfinished portion of the seventh floor of the W.E. Upjohn M.D. Campus allowed for Department of Pathology faculty, staff, laboratories, and resources to be housed together, a move meant to improve efficiency and address space constraints in the department's role in providing forensic pathology services for several Michigan counties. The renovation also provided room for the growth of anatomy education, resident and fellow training, and research.

History
The city of Kalamazoo, Michigan has a history in education, health care, research and life science exploration – all of which are assets for the development of a new medical school. Recognizing these assets, in 2007 the new president of Western Michigan University, John M. Dunn, challenged the community to consider the possibility of developing a medical school during his first academic convocation and state of the university address that October. Dunn's address sparked community interest and within six weeks a Medical School Feasibility Committee was formed. Consultants were retained to conduct detailed feasibility assessments in 2008 with funding provided by the local Kalamazoo Community Foundation. By January 2009, the feasibility studies confirmed what Dunn had observed during his short time in southwest Michigan – Kalamazoo has substantial existing assets and the necessary building blocks for developing an outstanding medical school.

With a commitment of collaboration from Western Michigan University, Ascension Borgess, and Bronson Healthcare, the medical school moved from merely an idea to a planned approach for the development of Western Michigan University School of Medicine (WMed). In November 2009, an anonymous donation of $1.8 million was made to support efforts to plan for the new medical school. A committee composed of the chief executive officers of Borgess Health, Bronson Healthcare, and the president of Western Michigan University began to meet regularly to guide the development process. In 2010, WMed was awarded Applicant Status by the Liaison Committee on Medical Education, a search committee was developed to recruit the school's founding dean, and Jack Luderer, MD was named interim dean. A Steering and Visioning Committee, later renamed the Institutional Setting Committee, included a broader group of the senior leadership of the three organizations. Following a national search with multiple on-site interviews of the candidates, Hal B. Jenson, MD, MBA was named as the founding dean of Western Michigan University School of Medicine in January 2011 and began March 22, 2011.

In March 2011, WMed received a $100 million anonymous cash gift. At the time, this anonymous gift was the largest ever made to a Michigan college or university, and the 15th largest cash gift in the history of American higher education. The gift proceeds remain invested in a dedicated reserve and both the investment return and principal are available for the unrestricted use of WMed.

December 8, 2011 marked another major milestone in the history of WMed. At the WMU Board of Trustees meeting, William U. Parfet, the chairman and chief executive officer of MPI Research and the great-grandson of W.E. Upjohn, donated to WMU a 330,000 square foot building located in downtown Kalamazoo that serves as the home of WMed. This property, which is on the original plot of land acquired by W.E. Upjohn to begin the Upjohn Co., housed at the very research facility where Motrin, Xanax, Halcion, Rogaine, and Zyvox were discovered. Locally known as Pfizer Building 267, the property is adjacent to Bronson and only three miles from Borgess, two miles from WMU, and the WMed Oakland Drive campus.

On October 12, 2012, a groundbreaking ceremony was held at the site of the new medical school building on the W.E. Upjohn M.D. Campus, which opened in June 2014, two months prior to the arrival of WMed's first medical school class in August 2014. During the groundbreaking ceremony, Dean Jenson announced that WMed was granted preliminary accreditation from the Liaison Committee on Medical Education, an important step, as WMed moves forward to recruit its first class of medical students.

WMed has more than 200 resident physicians training in the following residency programs: Emergency Medicine, Family Medicine, General Surgery, Internal Medicine, Medicine-Pediatrics, Obstetrics and Gynecology, Orthopaedic Surgery, Pediatrics, and Psychiatry, along with fellowships in EMS, Forensic Pathology, Hospice and Palliative Care, Simulation, and Sports Medicine. WMed has used electronic medical patient records since 2002 and provides a state-of-the-art Simulation Center for resident and medical student training that is one of the largest in the country.

On March 11, 2014, the University announced that the school would be named in honor of Dr. Homer Stryker, the Kalamazoo orthopedic surgeon and medical device innovator who founded the Stryker Corporation. At the same time it was announced that the original $100 million gift for the foundation of the school had been donated by Stryker's granddaughter, Ronda Stryker, and her husband, William Johnston.

SMAHEC and Michigan State University Kalamazoo Center for Medical Studies (MSU/KCMS)
In 1946, the Upjohn Company, the Kalamazoo Foundation and the W.E. Upjohn Trustee Corporation contributed to a grant establishing the first graduate medical education program in Kalamazoo: a residency in internal medicine at Bronson Methodist Hospital. Shortly thereafter, Borgess Medical Center began its internship and residency training programs.

For many years, Borgess and Bronson independently offered numerous internship and residency programs. In 1966, the first joint residency between hospitals - the Orthopaedic Surgery Program - was created.

The selfless contributions of people like Dr. Curtis Hanson, who proposed this program and subsequently served 24 years as the Orthopaedic Residency Program chief, created a rich heritage for the medical community in Kalamazoo. Given the success of the ortho residency and a shared desire to strengthen graduate medical education in Kalamazoo, in 1973 both hospitals agreed to form a joint venture, non-profit organization devoted to medical education: the Southwestern Michigan Area Health Education Center (SMAHEC).  SMAHEC's corporate structure was not conducive to responding to national changes in health care. In 1989, the organization restructured, with the College of Human Medicine at Michigan State University added as a corporate partner, and reemerged under a new name: Michigan State University Kalamazoo Center for Medical Studies (MSU/KCMS)

In 1994, the clinics and administrative offices, which had been scattered throughout the city, came together under one roof.

The MSU/KCMS Board of Directors approved the merger of the institution into WMed effective July 1, 2012. Under the terms of the merger, all MSU/KCMS operations, programs, personnel and facilities are wholly merged into and become part of WMed. This merger included the clinical education and patient care programs, administrative functions, 223 staff, 200 residents and 61 full-time employed faculty. In addition, there are more than 420 clinical faculty members as physicians in the community who volunteer their time and extend the educational experiences for medical students and residents into their private offices.

Kalamazoo's two health systems – Ascension Borgess and Bronson Healthcare – have decades of collaboration in providing undergraduate, graduate, and continuing medical education in Kalamazoo. Indeed, Kalamazoo has lacked only the first two years of medical school.  The senior leaders from both health systems, along with the president of WMU, recognized that a medical school best positions southwest Michigan to provide the latest care to patients and remain a leader in health care for generations to come. A medical school culture fosters medical advancement as faculty are actively engaged in the discovery and moving medical care forward while the best medical students catalyze the system through youthful inquisitiveness. A medical school attracts the intellectual talent that Kalamazoo and the region require to remain competitive. Stryker, Pfizer, MPI Research, Perrigo, and the younger life science start-up companies best illustrate the local culture of innovation and discovery. But there is a need for the continuous infusion of new talent and innovation to be competitive in the global marketplace. A medical school provides this foundation.

Effective July 1, 2012, the MSU/KCMS organization was merged into medical school. The merger included clinical education and patient care programs, administrative functions, faculty, staff, and significant infrastructure. In 2014 The school welcomed the 54 students into its first class, Class of 2018.

Accreditation

Medical school
In 2012, WMU School of Medicine was granted preliminary accreditation by the Liaison Committee on Medical Education (LCME), the national accrediting body for educational programs leading to the MD degree. The LCME determined that the medical school met the standards outlined in the LCME document, "Guidelines for New and Developing Medical Schools." This was important because the medical school was able to continue with its development efforts, to recruit students, and to accept applications for its first class that started in August 2014.

In 2018, WMU School of Medicine was granted full accreditation status by the LCME.

Graduate medical education
Residency programs at WMed are accredited by the Accreditation Council for Graduate Medical Education (ACGME).

Continuing education
Western Michigan University Homer Stryker M.D. School of Medicine Office of Continuing Education (CE) is jointly accredited by the Accreditation Council for Continuing Medical Education (ACCME), the Accreditation Council for Pharmacy Education (ACPE), and the American Nurses Credentialing Center (ANCC), to provide interprofessional continuing education for the healthcare team.

References

External links

Western Michigan University
Medical schools in Michigan
2012 establishments in Michigan
Education in Kalamazoo County, Michigan